Ibrahimpur may refer to several places in India:

 Ibrahimpur, Ranga Reddy district, Andhra Pradesh
 Ibrahimpur, Aurangabad, a List of villages in Aurangabad district, Bihar
 Ibrahim Pur, Delhi
 Ibrahimpur, Dharwad, Karnataka
 Ibrahimpur, SBS Nagar, Punjab
 Ibrahimpur, Azamgarh, Uttar Pradesh